The Talc City Hills is a mountain range in the northern Mojave Desert, in Inyo County, California.

They are just north of California State Route 190 west of Panamint Springs and east of Owens Lake, southeast of the Inyo Mountains, and north of the Coso Range.

See also
 Hidden Valley Dolomite Formation
 Lost Burro Formation

References 

Mountain ranges of Inyo County, California
Mountain ranges of the Mojave Desert
Hills of California